East London United is a South African football (soccer) club based in Eastern Cape.

History
Formed in 1967, East London Celtic were promoted to the NFL for the 1969-season. Before the following season, they were renamed East London United. They struggled throughout their spell in the NFL, their best seasons being 1970, 1976 and 1977, when they finished 9th.

External links
expro.co.za

See also
 National Football League (South Africa)

Soccer clubs in South Africa
National Football League (South Africa) clubs
1967 establishments in South Africa